Pop Max (formerly Kix! and then Kix) is a British free-to-air children's television channel in the United Kingdom, owned by Narrative Entertainment UK Limited. As of June 2014, it broadcasts cartoons, sci-fi, action and adventure series and anime on Sky and Freesat. Its target audience is 7 to 15-year-old boys.

History
At 6am on 19 May 2008, Pop +1 ceased broadcast and was directly replaced on-air with Kix content on Sky channel 627. Medabots was the first programme to be broadcast under the Kix! identity. 

Kix was the fourth dedicated kids' channel to be launched by CSC: its three sister channels are Pop which was launched in October 2002,  and shows cartoons and pop music videos for a mixed audience; Tiny Pop, which was launched in July 2004,  and shows cartoons for young children and pre-schoolers; and Pop Girl, launched in August 2007.

In August 2008, Kix! launched onto Freesat.

In May 2013, Kix! was renamed to Kix. The labelling on the onscreen programme guide was changed in accordance with this. However, the Kix logo continued to include the exclamation mark until summer 2014.

Unlike all the other channels from Narrative Capital, Pop Max is not on Virgin Media.

Kix broadcasts on Freeview since April 2016, following the earlier addition of Pop and Tiny Pop to the service. Until 2019, Kix transmitted on the same local-TV multiplex as Pop, so that Kix was only available in areas where Pop is available. In August 2017, Kix rebranded its identity and is now under the Pop Max brand; however, its programming remained relatively unchanged. In June 2019, Pop Max moved to the G-MAN multiplex, meaning that Pop Max only broadcasts in Manchester on Freeview. As of 2021, Pop Max is not widely available on Freeview in the UK.

In early 2022, a live Pop Max stream was added to the Freeview Play version of the Pop Player app. On 25 May 2022, Pop Max was delisted from Freeview and was replaced with the Pop Player channel.

As of 2022, Angry Birds Toons and Voltron: Legendary Defender are the only Pop Max exclusive programs.

Sky channel moves
As part of the major EPG reshuffle on 1 May 2018, Pop Max moved from channel 627 to 626, Pop Max +1 moved from channel 629 to 627.

On 11 January 2021, Pop Max moved from channel 626 to 620.

On 11 January 2021, Pop Max +1 moved from channel 627 to 621.

Availability

Online
FilmOn : Watch live

Satellite
Freesat : Channel 604 (SD) and Manual (+1)
Sky  and Sky : Channel 620 (SD) and Channel 621 (+1)

Terrestrial
Freeview : Channel 208 (Pop Player)

Kix Power and Kix +1
In July 2013, Kix received Kix Power, which replaced Pop Girl +1 on Sky. Kix Power broadcast only Power Rangers. Kix Power was replaced by a Kix +1 service in October 2013,  and this timeshift ran through October to November 2013. Kix Power was then reintroduced in November 2013 for a second run, to operate in the run-up to December 2013, with Kix +1 resuming at the start of January 2014. Kix Power returned again, replacing Kix +1, on an ad hoc basis around major school holiday periods.

In April 2014, Kix +1 relaunched this time as Kix +. In July 2014, Kix + was closed down and replaced with Pop +1, which closed in 2008 and was replaced with Kix. In October 2014, Kix was rebranded as Kix Power for the October half-term. In October 2015, Kix +1 relaunched, replacing Pop Girl. In June 2016, Kix +1 was removed from Freesat and was replaced with Pop +1. In December 2016, Kix Power launched on Virgin Media.

Programming
The channel sources its programming from multiple independent studios.

Current programming
Angry Birds Toons
Bakugan: Battle Planet
Bakugan: Geogan Rising
Grizzy & the Lemmings (also on Boomerang)
Lego City Adventures (also on Nickelodeon)
Nate Is Late
Pokémon the Series: Black & White (also on CBBC and BBC iPlayer)
Pokémon: Black & White
Pokémon: Black & White: Rival Destinies
Pokémon the Series: XY and XYZ
Pokémon the Series: XY
Pokémon the Series: XY Kalos Quest
Pokémon the Series: XYZ
Pokémon Journeys: The Series
Pokémon Journeys: The Series
Pokémon Master Journeys: The Series
Power Players
Power Rangers Beast Morphers
Skylanders Academy
Space Chickens in Space
The Strange Chores
Talking Tom and Friends

Former programming

100 Deeds for Eddie McDowd
3 Amigonauts
ALVINNN!!! and the Chipmunks (now on Nickelodeon and Pop)
Bakugan: Armored Alliance
Bakugan: Battle Brawlers
The Batman
Batman Beyond
Beyblade
Beyblade Burst
Biker Mice from Mars (2006 series)
Bunny Maloney
Code Lyoko
Clay Kids
Cosmic Quantum Ray
Counterfeit Cat
Cupcake & Dino: General Services (now on Pop)
Detentionaire
Digimon Data Squad
Dino Squad
Dinosaur King
Dr. Dimensionpants
Dragon Ball GT
Dragon Ball Z
Dragon Ball Z Kai
Dragon Ball Super (now on Pop)
The Dukes of Broxstonia
Freaktown
Get Ace
Grojband
Hanazuki: Full of Treasures
The High Fructose Adventures of Annoying Orange
Inazuma Eleven (seasons 1 and 2 only)
Iron Man: Armored Adventures
Justice League
Justice League Unlimited
Lab Rats Challenge
Legend of the Dragon (now on London Live as part of London Live Kids)
Legends of Chima
Lego Friends: Girls on a Mission (now on Pop)
LEGO Nexo Knights
Medabots
Mega Man: Fully Charged
Metajets
Miraculous: Tales of Ladybug & Cat Noir (now on Pop)
Monster Warriors
The Mr. Peabody & Sherman Show
¡Mucha Lucha!
My Dad the Rock Star
Naruto 
Naruto Shippuden (censored version)
Ninja Turtles: The Next Mutation
Numb Chucks
Oh No! It's an Alien Invasion
Oggy and the Cockroaches
Pinky and the Brain
Pirate Express
Pokémon the Series: Diamond and Pearl (now on CBBC and BBC iPlayer)
Pokémon the Series: Diamond and Pearl: Battle Dimension
Pokémon the Series: Diamond and Pearl: Galactic Battles
Pokémon the Series: Diamond and Pearl: Sinnoh League Victors
Pokémon the Series: Black & White (now on CBBC and BBC iPlayer)
Pokémon: Black & White: Rival Destinies
Pokémon: Black & White: Adventures in Unova
Pokémon: Black & White: Adventures in Unova and Beyond
Pokémon the Series: Sun & Moon (now on CBBC and BBC iPlayer)
Pokémon the Series: Sun & Moon
Pokémon the Series: Sun & Moon – Ultra Adventures
Pokémon the Series: Sun & Moon – Ultra Legends
Power Rangers
Power Rangers Dino Charge
Power Rangers Dino Thunder (now on demand on Sky Kids)
Power Rangers in Space
Power Rangers Jungle Fury
Power Rangers Megaforce
Power Rangers Mystic Force (now on demand on Sky Kids)
Power Rangers Ninja Steel
Power Rangers Ninja Storm
Power Rangers Operation Overdrive (now on demand on Sky Kids)
Power Rangers R.P.M
Power Rangers Samurai
Power Rangers S.P.D. (now on demand on Sky Kids)
Power Rangers Time Force
Power Rangers Wild Force
Rabbids Invasion
Rated A for Awesome
Scan2Go
SheZow
Slugterra
Sonic Boom
Sonic the Hedgehog
Sonic Underground
The Spectacular Spider-Man
Storm Hawks
Tales from the Cryptkeeper
Total Drama Island (edited and censored version, now on Pop Player)
Total DramaRama (now on Pop)
The Transformers
Transformers Cybertron
Transformers: Cyberverse (now on Pop)
Transformers: Rescue Bots
Trollhunters: Tales of Arcadia
Trolls: The Beat Goes On! (now on Pop and Tiny Pop)
Ultimate Muscle
Voltron: Legendary Defender
Wolverine and the X-Men
X-Men: Evolution
Yu-Gi-Oh! (now on YouTube)
Yu-Gi-Oh!
Yu-Gi-Oh! GX
Yu-Gi-Oh! Zexal
Zak Storm

Logos

References

External links

CSC Media Group
Children's television networks
Children's television channels in the United Kingdom
English-language television stations in the United Kingdom
Television channels in the United Kingdom
Television channels and stations established in 2008
Sony Pictures Television
2008 establishments in the United Kingdom